Daniel "Danny" Kass (born September 21, 1982) is an American professional snowboarder who has competed at the Olympic level.

Kass was born in Pompton Plains, New Jersey, and began snowboarding in the area at the age of twelve. His home slopes are what are now known as Hidden Valley and Mountain Creek ski resorts, both located in the mountains of Vernon Township and Highland Lakes. After several years of shredding around the Mid-Atlantic States, Kass entered the Okemo Mountain School in Vermont to focus more of his time on riding some of the better pipe and park in the East. In 2001, Danny broke out into what has become one of the most successful contest streaks in snowboarding with four US Open Championships, seven Winter X Games medals and two Olympic silver medals.

During the winter of 2006, Kass fought his way back from a slow start in the US Grand Prix Circuit to qualify for the Olympics in Torino for the second time in a row. And just like in 2002, Kass took home another silver medal with back-to-back 1080s and his signature smooth style.
Kass and his brother Matt Kass were the founders of Grenade Gloves, which specializes in snowboarding gloves, accessories, and other extreme sporting gear.

Kass is one of the stars of The Adventures of Danny and The Dingo on Fuel TV.

References 

https://web.archive.org/web/20120701191747/http://www.yobeat.com/2012/02/22/matt-kasss-hump-day/

The Adventures of Danny and The Dingo at FUEL.TV

The Adventures of Danny and The Dingo at IMDB.COM

1982 births
Living people
American male snowboarders
Snowboarders at the 2002 Winter Olympics
Snowboarders at the 2006 Winter Olympics
Olympic silver medalists for the United States in snowboarding
X Games athletes
People from Pequannock Township, New Jersey
Medalists at the 2006 Winter Olympics
Medalists at the 2002 Winter Olympics
Sportspeople from Morris County, New Jersey
20th-century American people
21st-century American people